The Yeezus Tour was a concert tour by American rapper Kanye West in support of West's sixth solo studio album, Yeezus (2013). The venture served as West's first solo concert tour in five years. Kendrick Lamar, A Tribe Called Quest, Travis Scott, and Pusha T served as opening acts on select dates. It had the second highest grossing leg of a tour during 2013, behind Paul McCartney's Out There! Tour. It was the highest-grossing hip-hop tour of 2013, grossing $31.8 million from 33 shows.

Background
After the release of Yeezus on June 18, 2013, rumors begun circulating that West would embark on a solo tour. Co-producer of the album Mike Dean reported that there would be a tour for the album and that he would be a backing producer for the show. On September 6, 2013, West tweeted the word "TOUR" along with the promotional picture of the tour. All of the opening tour dates (of which were in North America) became available via his official website.

Kendrick Lamar served as a supporting act on the majority of the tour, with "special guests" replacing him on the dates he missed. At the October 25, 2013 show, GOOD Music signee Pusha T served as the opening act. On October 15, 2013, it was revealed that two of the four New York shows will feature A Tribe Called Quest as supporting acts instead of Lamar. These concerts were stated to be A Tribe Called Quest's final performances ever, which ultimately proved untrue as they reunited two years later.

Stage and equipment

West said that the initial idea of The Yeezus Tour came from him thinking about the end of the world, with explosions, fire, mountains, masked beings, creatures and Jesus all making appearances during the show. Family New York, Vanessa Beecroft, Es Devlin and John McGuire created the scenography with both Maison Martin Margiela and West working together to create fashion pieces and outfits for The Yeezus Tour. The stage used by West also resembled a fashion catwalk.
Another influence for the stage setup, according to West, came from the 1973 film The Holy Mountain, a "biblical redemption story". This can be seen with one of the stages main features; a 50-foot high mountain, called Mount Yeezus by some, that could change its appearance into a volcano. The foot of the mountain then lead to a secondary stage that elevated up to the main stage that was shaped like a triangle and could rise. As part of the redemption theme, the performance is separated into five parts, Fighting, Rising, Falling, Searching and Finding, that feature 12 female dancers that some called "disciples". Above Mount Yeezus, a 60-foot wide circular LED screen was placed along with a custom sound system by DONDA.

On October 30, 2013 while on the road to Vancouver, a truck carrying custom-made video screens and equipment for the show was involved in a car crash; the crash damaged the equipment beyond repair. Def Jam issued a statement on the issue saying, "This gear is central to the staging of The Yeezus Tour, and central to the creative vision put forth by Kanye West and his design team at DONDA. As a result of this event, it is impossible to put on the show and The Yeezus Tour will be postponed until these essential pieces can be reengineered and refabricated. Kanye West will not compromise on bringing the show, as it was originally envisioned and designed, to his fans. The Vancouver, Denver and Minneapolis dates have been postponed."

The tour picked back up on November 16, 2013, at the Wells Fargo Center in Philadelphia. The missed Chicago and Detroit shows were rescheduled however, the rest of the missed dates were cancelled, Def Jam cites routing logistics as the reason.
On January 7, 2014 Kanye West added 9 new dates to the tour, starting on February 13 in University Park, Pennsylvania and concluding on February 23 at Uniondale, New York.

In February 2014, dates were announced for an Australian leg of the Yeezus Tour, beginning May 2 at Perth Arena in Perth. However, in early April West postponed his Australian leg until September, using the months in-between to finish his then upcoming seventh studio album, The Life of Pablo. The Australian leg of the tour was stripped down compared to the North American tour, with a minimalist aesthetic.

Reception
The tour was met with rave reviews from critics. Rolling Stone described it as "crazily entertaining, hugely ambitious, emotionally affecting (really!) and, most importantly, totally bonkers." Writing for Forbes, Zack O'Malley Greenburg praised West for "taking risks that few pop stars, if any, are willing to take in today's hyper-exposed world of pop", describing the show as "overwrought and uncomfortable at times, but [it] excels at challenging norms and provoking thought in a way that just isn’t common for mainstream musical acts of late." NY Daily News wrote that "the show wasn’t about crowd-pleasing. It was about unyielding beats, hellish textures and a brusque flow, all delivered with an impact every bit as stunning as West's ego itself." In 2019, Vivid Seats named it the 68th greatest tour of all time.

Set list
The tour told a story of redemption through 5 categories, Fighting, Rising, Falling, Searching, and Finding. West performed every track from Yeezus, along with some of his greatest hits.

Fighting 
"On Sight"
"New Slaves"
"Send It Up"
"Mercy"

Rising 
"Power"
"Cold"
"I Don't Like"
"Clique" 
"Black Skinhead"
"I Am a God"
"Can't Tell Me Nothing (Remix)"
"Coldest Winter"

Falling 
"Hold My Liquor"
"I'm In It"
"Guilt Trip"
"Heartless"
"Blood on the Leaves"

Searching 
"Lost in the World"
"Runaway"
"Street Lights"

Finding 
"Stronger"
"Through the Wire"
"Jesus Walks"
"Diamonds From Sierra Leone" 
"Flashing Lights"
"All of the Lights"
"Good Life"
"Bound 2"

The tour featured the unreleased track "I Am Not Home," which was used as an opener for the sets, among with a shortened version of Mozart’s Lacrimosa.

Shows

Members 
The following individuals were members of the Yeezus tour:

Mike Dean
Noah Goldstein
Che Pope 
Renelou Padora 
Don C 
Elon Rutberg 
Ibn Jasper 
Virgil Abloh 
Vanessa Beecroft
Izvor Zivkovic
Matthew Williams 
Alex Rosenberg
Jerry Lorenzo
Tracey Mills
Dan Gieckel
Mano (tour Dj)
Ricky Anderson
Sakiya Sandifer 
Justin Saunders 
Pascal Duvier
Yemi A.D.

References

Kanye West concert tours
2013 concert tours
2014 concert tours